Dr. J. H. Harris House is a historic home located at 312 East Mason Street in Franklinton, Franklin County, North Carolina.  It was built between 1902 and 1904, and is a two-story, rectangular Queen Anne style frame dwelling.  It features a tall, steep deck-and-hip roof; projecting bays, gables, dormers, and towers; and a one-story wraparound porch.

It was listed on the National Register of Historic Places in 1975. The home now serves as a local bed & breakfast and private events venue called The Mason Street Manor.

References

External links
The Mason Street Manor (official site)

Houses on the National Register of Historic Places in North Carolina
Houses completed in 1904
Queen Anne architecture in North Carolina
Houses in Franklin County, North Carolina
National Register of Historic Places in Franklin County, North Carolina